The Second Nawaz Sharif ministry began on 3 February 1997, when Nawaz Sharif was sworn in as the Prime Minister of Pakistan, and ended without completing its mandated term on 12 October 1999. Sharif, a conservative politician who presided the Pakistan Muslim League from Punjab, took the office following a decisive victory in the primary elections held in 1997 over the Pakistan Peoples Party– a left-leaning political party. The second administration of Sharif ended with the precedence of Musharraf administration in 1999 when the military took over the control of the federal government.

Cabinet

Federal Ministers
 Ishaq Dar
 Sartaj Aziz
 Gohar Ayub Khan
 Shujaat Hussain
 Syeda Abida Hussain
 Nisar Ali Khan
 Muhammad Azam Khan Hoti
 Sheikh Rashid Ahmed
 Syed Ghous Ali Shah
 Makhdoom Muhammad Javed Hashmi
 Raja Nadir Pervaiz Khan
 Malik Abdul Majeed
 Sardar Muhammad Yaqub Khan Nasar
 Mian Muhammad Yaseen Khan Wattoo
 Mian Abdul Sattar Laleka
 Raja Mohammad Zafar -ul-Haq
 Khalid Maqbool Siddiqui
 Mushahid Hussain Syed
 Khalid Anwar

State Ministers
 Asghar Ali Shah
 Syed Ahmed Mehmud
 Muhammad Siddique Khan Kanju
 Haleem Ahmed Siddiqui
 Tahmina Daultana

References

1997 establishments in Pakistan
Nawaz Sharif
Cabinets established in 1997
1990s in Pakistan
1990s in politics